The Maranhão gubernatorial election of 1998 was held in the Brazilian state of Maranhão on October 4, alongside Brazil's general elections. PFL candidate, Roseana Sarney, was re-elected on October 4, 1998.

References 

1998
1998 Brazilian gubernatorial elections